Kaliro Power Station is a  bagasse-fired thermal power plant in Uganda, the third-largest economy in the East African Community.

Location
The power station is located on the campus of Sugar & Allied Industries Limited, the owners of the power station. The coordinates of the power station are 0°56'50.0"N, 33°29'13.0"E (Latitude:0.947217; Longitude:33.486939).

Overview
Kaliro Power Station is owned and operated by Sugar & Allied Industries Limited (SAIL), the third-largest sugar manufacturer in Uganda. The power station was designed and built around the sugar manufacturing plant of SAIL. The fibrous residue from the process of crushing sugar cane, known as bagasse, is burnt to heat water in boilers and produce steam. The steam is pressurized and used to drive turbines which then generate electricity. The excess heat is used in the sugar manufacturing process. , the power station was capable of producing a maximum of 12MW of electricity, 5MW of which was utilized internally by SAIL. The remaining 7MW is sold to the national electricity grid. The plant is expandable to a maximum capacity of 22MW. Both SAIL and Kaliro Power Station are subsidiaries and member companies of the Alam Group, a multimillion-dollar conglomerate based in Uganda with subsidiaries in Kenya and Rwanda.

Licensure
In October 2014, the Electricity Regulatory Authority issued a power production license to Kaliro Power Station for 11.9MW.

See also

References

External links
All Uganda's Three Major Sugar Factories Co-generate Electricity From Bagasse
Analysis of Uganda's Present And Future Electricity Needs And Sources

Industrial buildings completed in 2014
Bagasse-fired power stations in Uganda
Kaliro District
Alam Group